Whoa may refer to:

 A voice command asking a horse to stop

Songs
"Whoa!" (Black Rob song), 2000
"Whoa" (Earl Sweatshirt song), 2013
"Whoa" (Lil Kim song), 2006
"Whoa", by Paramore from All We Know Is Falling, 2005
"Whoa!", by Soul Asylum from Made to Be Broken, 1986
"Whoa", by the Soviettes from LP III, 2005
"Whoa", by We the Kings from We the Kings, 2007
"Whoa (Mind in Awe)", by XXXTentacion from Skins, 2018

Other media
Whoa, a character in the film Kung Pow! Enter the Fist
"Whoa!", character Joey Russo's catchphrase on the television show Blossom
Whoa!, a newspaper in the Regional Municipality of Peel, Ontario, Canada

See also
 WOAH (disambiguation)
Whoa, Nelly!, an album by Nelly Furtado
"Whoa Oh! (Me vs. Everyone)", a song by Forever the Sickest Kids
"Like Whoa", a song by Aly & AJ